Pam Shriver and Elizabeth Smylie were the defending champions but did not compete that year.

Patty Fendick and Meredith McGrath won in the final 6–2, 6–3 against Jana Novotná and Arantxa Sánchez Vicario.

Seeds
Champion seeds are indicated in bold text while text in italics indicates the round in which those seeds were eliminated.

 Jana Novotná /  Arantxa Sánchez Vicario (final)
n/a
 Conchita Martínez /  Rennae Stubbs (quarterfinals)
 Zina Garrison-Jackson /  Mary Joe Fernández (quarterfinals)

Draw

External links
 1994 Peters NSW Open Women's Doubles Draw

Women's Doubles
Doubles